Maszewo Lęborskie is a non-operational PKP railway station in Maszewo Lęborskie (Pomeranian Voivodeship), Poland.

Lines crossing the station

References 

Maszewo Lęborskie article at Polish Stations Database, URL accessed at 27 March 2006

Railway stations in Pomeranian Voivodeship
Disused railway stations in Pomeranian Voivodeship
Lębork County